Theodore Ernst Kara (April 2, 1916 – February 14, 1944) was an American featherweight boxer who competed in the 1936 Summer Olympics in Berlin.

Boxing career 
He competed in the Men's Featherweight Boxing at the 1936 Olympics and was eliminated in the quarter-finals, after losing to the upcoming silver medalist Charles Catterall. Kara also won three NCAA boxing titles for the University of Idaho, in 1939, 1940 and 1941.

1936 Olympic results
Below are the results of Theodore Kara:

 Round of 32: defeated Felipe Gabuco (Philippines) referee stopped contest in the third round
 Round of 16: defeated Evald Seepere (Estonia) on points
 Quarterfinal: lost to Charles Catterall (South Africa) on points

Army career and disappearance 
Kara was a radio-man in the United States Army Air Corps and was declared dead after his plane went missing in action over the Pacific in 1944 during World War II. He was married at the time of his death to Marion Amirkanian of Fresno, California, but had no children. His brother Frank was also an NCAA boxing champion.

See also
List of people who disappeared mysteriously at sea

References

External links

Olympic profile
University of Idaho Hall of Fame

External links

1916 births
1940s missing person cases
1944 deaths
Aerial disappearances of military personnel in action
American male boxers
Boxers at the 1936 Summer Olympics
Boxers from Cleveland
Featherweight boxers
Missing in action of World War II
Olympic boxers of the United States
People lost at sea
United States Army Air Forces personnel killed in World War II